Ras Shokeir Airport  is an airport serving the Suez Gulf town of Ras Shokeir, Egypt.

See also
Transport in Egypt
List of airports in Egypt

References

 Google Earth

External links
OurAirports - Ras Shukhayr New
Ras Shukhayr New Airport
OpenStreetMap - Ras Shokeir
 airportname.com

Airports in Egypt